Staines Down Drains is a co-produced children's television series created by Jim Mora. The series was premiered on the Seven Network in October 2006 and broadcast in New Zealand on TV2 beginning on 28 February 2007. A second series of 13 episodes was announced in 2009-each 11-minutes long-but these episodes were never produced.

Synopsis 
The series follows siblings Stanley and Mary-Jane Staines as they travel through a portal down their sink in the basement to Drainland. There they assist Vegety Bill a strong carrot looking figure, Blobert a purple blob, and Herk a furball, in defeating Dr. Drain. Stanley is germaphobic while Mary-Jane is brave. Their mother Betty is always getting a new job which usually causes the complication in the episodes. Their arch enemy Gretel is always trying to embarrass the Staines.

Production 
The series is distributed by Studio 100. It is animated by Flux Animation with assistance from Studio 100. The series is associated with Yoram Gross. As with many other titles from the company, they lend the voice who usually plays the main male characters, Keith Scott. Series one first broadcast in November 2006 with a second series announced in late 2009. This second season was later cancelled before being completed for unknown reasons.

Main characters 
Stanley Staines is a germaphobic boy who tries to avoid doing anything out of the ordinary, his phobia may stop him from going to Drainland. However, he is encouraged by his sister, Vegety, Herk and Blobert.
Mary-Jane Staines is a brave girl who is very adventurous and smart. She usually helps Stanley in assisting Drainlands problem. She is worst enemies with Gretel and the two usually argue with each other.
Betty Staines is Stanley and Mary-Jane's somewhat dipsy mother. She is always starting a new career and usually messes up doing it.
Vegety Bill is an heroic carrot like figure who is dedicated to protecting the Drainworld plants. He is best friends with Herk and Blobert and together fight Dr. Drain and the Goblers.
Blobert is a small purple blob who moves around like a slug. He is not very smart and usually helps Herk and Vegety.
Herk is a small brown hairball who helps Vegety in protecting the plants. He is best friends with Blobert.
Dr Drain is an evil dictator, bent on destroying Drainland and building an empire on its ruins. With his companions the Goblers, he tries to rid Drainland of its purifying plants.
Gretel is the arch enemy of Mary-Jane. She is a spoilt girl who usually bullies the Staines with her friends, the Lupe brothers.
The Goblers are the henchmen of Dr. Drain.
The Lupin Lupes are the friends of Gretel.

Episodes

Series 1

References

External links 

Staines Down Drains at Television New Zealand

2006 Australian television series debuts
2000s Australian animated television series
Australian children's animated comedy television series
Australian children's animated drama television series
Australian flash animated television series
APRA Award winners
Seven Network original programming
Animated television series about siblings
Animated television series about children